Government ministries in Ukraine are the central bodies that are entrusted to implement a state policies in a certain field of government (finance, justice, interior etc.). Each ministry is governed by a respective minister. The collective of ministries is called the Cabinet of Ministers of Ukraine. The modern Ukrainian ministries were first established after the February Revolution of 1917 when the Russian Emperor was forced to abdicate. The first ministries (secretariats) were Secretariat of state, Finance, Justice, Labor, Education, Communication, Trade and Industry, Transportation, Military, Agriculture, and Office of General Secretariat (General Secretariat of Ukraine).

Current Ministries

Former ministries

 Ministry of Industrial Policy (or Industry) 1997–2014
 Ministry of Machine-building, Military-Industrial Complex, and Conversion 1996–1997 (transformed) 
 Ministry of Emergencies (or Emergencies and Protection of Population from the Consequences of the Chernobyl Catastrophe) 1991–2012 (degraded)
 Foreign Relations and Trade 1991–2000
 Ministry of Trade 1991–1992 (merged)
 Ministry of Science and Technology 1996–1999
 Ministry of Revenues and Duties 2012–2014
 Ministry of Coal [Mining] Industry 1987–2010
 Ministry of Public Housing and Utilities 2007–2010
 Ministry of Family Affairs and Youth 1996–2005 (merged) → Youth and Sports
 Ministry of Labor 1990–2010 (transitioned) → Social Policy
 Ministry of Transportation 1953–2010 (merged) → Infrastructure
 Ministry of Automobile Transportation (degraded) → Ukravtodor
 Ministry of Construction and Exploitation of Automobile Roads
 Ministry of [Rail]ways 1917–1920
 [Former agrarian ministries]
 Ministry of Fishing [Resources] Management 1995 - 1997
 Ministry of Bread Products
 Ministry of Rural Development
 Ministry of State Farms
 Ministry of Industrial Construction Materials
 Ministry of Social Security
 Ministry of Forest Management
 Ministry of Amelioration and Water Management
 Ministry of Light Industry
 Ministry of Special Construction
 Ministry of Construction (Construction and Architecture)
 Ministry of Higher and Special General Education
 Ministry of Statistics
 Ministry of Exterior Economy
 Ministry of Denationalization and De-monopolization
 Ministry of Nationalities and Migration
 Ministry in relationship with Verkhovna Rada
 Ministry of Press (Information)
 Ministry of Higher Education
 Ministry of Communication
 Ministry of Forest, Cellulose-Paper, and Wood Processing Industry
 Ministry of Fruits and Vegetables
 Ministry of Meat and Milk Industry
 Ministry of Food Industry
 Ministry of Preparations
 Ministry of Consumer Services of Population
 Ministry of Geology
 Ministry of Black Metallurgy
 Ministry of Montage and Special Construction
 Ministry of Industrial Construction

Original ministries (secretariats)

See also
 Cabinet of Ministers of Ukraine

References

 
Government of Ukraine